Yvonne Sampson  (born 21 July 1980) is an Australian television sports presenter and commentator.

Sampson currently works for Fox Sports. She has previously worked for Nine's Wide World of Sports and was weekend sports presenter for Nine News Sydney.

Early and personal life
Sampson grew up on the Sunshine Coast, Queensland, Australia on a farm near Palmwoods. 

Sampson is of Indigenous Australian heritage, with her paternal grandmother being indigenous.

In April 2017, Sampson announced that she is engaged to Nine News reporter Chris O'Keefe. They married in 2018.

Television career

With a little help of a chance encounter between her taxi-driving father and former NRL player Wendell Sailor, Sampson began her career as a cadet reporter at the Seven Network's regional news service, Seven Local News on the Sunshine Coast working one day a week, while juggling her studies at the Queensland University of Technology and employment with the Eagle Farm Equine Hospital.

Upon completion of her studies, Sampson joined the network permanently as a sports reporter, working throughout the state in cities such as Maryborough, Mackay and Townsville before returning to the Sunshine Coast to also becoming a studio presenter.

Near the end of the decade, she was given the opportunity to work for a national bulletin for the first time, joining Sky News as a reporter and presenter.

In 2012, Sampson returned to Queensland, joining the Nine Network in Brisbane.  In January 2014, Sampson was offered the opportunity to return to Sydney to be more extensively involved with Nine's Wide World of Sports coverage including presenting the sport on Nine News Sydney.

In 2015, she co-commentated the NRL grand final between the North Queensland Cowboys and the Brisbane Broncos. She is quoted saying that this was the greatest and most challenging assignment she’d had on a football field, due to the emotion and excitement of the ending.

While Sampson was at Nine she hosted Nine's Friday Night Rugby League coverage and was also a sideline commentator for Thursday Night Football and Sunday Football. In September 2015, she hosted Nine's new NRL talk show Footy Classified NRL Finals.

In 2016, she became the host of the Sunday Footy Show, replacing long time host Peter Sterling. The same year, Sampson also became the first woman to anchor the network's State of Origin coverage.

In December 2016, she signed a multi year deal with Fox Sports. It was announced that she would host the network's Thursday and Saturday night rugby league coverage and also host a new weekly show called League Life.

In June 2021, she joined the panel as the new host of Fox League show, NRL 360, after Ben Ikin moved to the Brisbane Broncos.

References

External links

 

1980 births
Living people
Australian rugby league commentators
Australian television presenters
Australian women television presenters
Nine's Wide World of Sport
Fox Sports (Australian TV network) people
Australian people of Indigenous Australian descent